The "revenge dress" is an evening gown once worn by Diana, Princess of Wales. It was worn for the first time to a 1994 dinner at the Serpentine Gallery in Kensington Gardens. The garment has been interpreted as having been worn by Diana "in revenge" for the televised admission of adultery by her husband Charles, then Prince of Wales.

Design
The dress, an off-the-shoulder black silk evening gown, was designed by Christina Stambolian. Stambolian compared Diana's choice of black to the black swan Odile in Tchaikovsky's ballet Swan Lake, saying that Diana "chose not to play the scene like Odette, innocent in white. She played it like Odile. She was clearly angry." Diana had owned the dress for three years before she wore it, fearing it was "too daring". The dress cost . Diana had planned to wear a dress by Valentino before choosing Stambolian's design. Anna Harvey, Diana's former stylist, said that Diana "wanted to look a million dollars... and she did".

History

The event to which the dress was worn was a 29 June 1994 fundraising dinner hosted by Vanity Fair magazine for the Serpentine Gallery in Kensington Gardens. Diana had declined the dinner invitation; however, two days prior to the dinner, following several days' publicity of Charles' infidelity revelations, she accepted the invitation. Diana found out about Charles' infidelity in different ways prior to the dinner. An example is in some newspaper headlines they reported "Charles: I Cheated on Diana" and "Di told you so". A television programme about her husband Prince Charles was broadcast, in which he admitted to having been unfaithful to her after their marriage had "irretrievably broken down". Charles and Diana had separated two years prior to the broadcast of the programme. Diana's biographer Sarah Bradford wrote that Diana "feigned indifference" in regards to the programme.

Diana was seen wearing the dress after she exited her car and was greeted by Lord Palumbo, the chair of the trustees of the Serpentine Gallery, before entering the gallery. The photographer who captured Diana arriving at the event, Tim Graham, said that her arrival lasted only 30 seconds in total, and that Diana would have known a large number of photographers would be present following her husband's revelations. Palumbo later recalled that Diana "bounded out of the car in that wonderfully athletic way that she had".

Following the dinner, the dress was described as the "I'll Show You dress", the "Serpentine Cocktail" and the "Vengeance dress", as well as the "Revenge dress". In her 2007 book The Diana Chronicles, Tina Brown wrote that Diana's dress was known by fashion editors as "her fuck-you dress".

The dress was sold at auction in July 1997 for £39,098. The dress was bought by a Scottish couple who planned to use it to raise money for children's charities. The dress was exhibited in the Museum of Style in Newbridge, County Kildare in their 2017 exhibition Diana: A Fashion Legacy, where it was described as "the most important exhibit". Penny Goldstone wrote in Marie Claire in 2020 that the dress remains one of Diana's "most iconic styles of all time".

Aftermath

The day following the event, The Daily Telegraph wrote:

The Princess of Wales did not have to dine out before the television cameras at the Serpentine Gallery last night in order to avoid seeing her husband sharing his soul with the nation on the box. She could have watched a video, played bridge or simply washed her hair and curled up in bed... It's amazing what some people will do to avoid press speculation.

Elle Pithers, writing for Vogue magazine, described the dress as the "progenitor of 'revenge dressing. In 2020, writing for The Daily Telegraph Bethan Holt stated that the dress encompassed "the act of reclaiming the narrative", and was the "ultimate modern example of revenge dressing", in an article about women who have found inspiration in Diana Spencer's choice of the dress. Holt wrote, "Hell hath no fury like a woman scorned. But also: fashion hath no greater thrill than when being deployed for the purpose of expressing rage, froideur or an insouciant dose of 'look what you're missing.

The dress was analyzed by Caroline McCauley in Fashion, Agency, and Empowerment: Performing Agency, Following Script, and it was interpreted as part of Diana's couture of "revenge" following the breakdown of her marriage to Charles after years of having "snippets of a seductive glamour hidden by a proper royal purity". Caroline McCauley wrote that instead of "cowering in shame" following Charles's admission, "Diana arrived in a figure-hugging black silk dress with a pearl choker necklace, black pumps, and scarlet lipstick and nail polish". Georgina Howell, in her 1998 book Diana, Her Life in Fashion, wrote that the dress was "possibly the most strategic dress ever worn by a woman in modern times", further describing it as a "devastating wisp of black chiffon" with which Diana "flipped her husband clean off the front pages" following the broadcast of the programme. "The Thrilla He Left to Woo Camilla" was the headline of The Sun the following day.

See also

 Travolta dress
 Wedding dress of Lady Diana Spencer
 List of individual dresses

References

1994 clothing
1994 in London
Diana, Princess of Wales
Revenge
British royal attire
Royal dresses
Black dresses